John Watherston Watt (2 November 1890 – 19 December 1964) was an Australian rules footballer who played with Geelong, Melbourne and St Kilda in the Victorian Football League (VFL).

See also
 1916 Pioneer Exhibition Game

Notes

References
 Holmesby, Russell & Main, Jim (2009), The Encyclopedia of AFL Footballers: every AFL/VFL player since 1897 (8th ed.), Seaford, Victoria: BAS Publishing. 
 First World War Embarkation Roll: Mechanical Transport Driver John Watherston Watt (11950), collection of the Australian War Memorial.
 First World War Nominal Roll: Driver John Watherston Watt (11950), collection of the Australian War Memorial.
 First World War Service Record: Driver John Watherston Watt (11950), National Archives of Australia.

External links 

1890 births
1964 deaths
Australian rules footballers from Victoria (Australia)
Geelong Football Club players
Melbourne Football Club players
St Kilda Football Club players
East Geelong Football Club players
People educated at Geelong College